Bill Copeland Sports Centre is a 2,000-seat, multi-purpose arena in Burnaby, British Columbia. The arena is primarily used for ice hockey and lacrosse.

Bill Copeland Sports Centre was the host venue for the 2019 World Ringette Championships and the 2013 Esso Cup.  It is also the home arena for the Burnaby Lakers of the Western Lacrosse Association and home arena of the Vancouver North West Hawks of the BC Hockey Major Midget League.

References

Indoor lacrosse venues in Canada
Indoor ice hockey venues in British Columbia
British Columbia Hockey League arenas
Sports venues in British Columbia
Buildings and structures in Burnaby
Sport in Burnaby
Tourist attractions in Burnaby